Men of Burden: Pedaling towards a Horizon is a 2006 documentary film set in the city of Pondicherry in the Indian territory of Puducherry, about the cycle rickshaw industry.

Background and content

The documentary tells the story of disappearing cycle rickshaw drivers living in abject poverty. Over time, the city has experienced a gradual reduction in the number of cycle rickshaws, thereby affecting the livelihoods of those who depend on them. The film considers the ethical dimensions of the trade against the increasing impact of motorised transport and air pollution.

The aim of the film was to raise awareness and funds for Men of Burden – Cycle rickshaw Revival (MOBCRR), an initiative to promote the cycle rickshaw sector and sustainable transport, in order to protect the rickshaw drivers as well as the environment.

Release
The film had its world premiere at the Los Angeles Indian Film Festival, European premiere at the Filmburo Baden-Wurttemberg's Bollywood and Beyond Film Festival and its New York premiere at the sixth annual Indo-American Arts Council Film Festival.

External links 

Men of Burden - Cycle Rickshaw Revival Project MOBCRR
Men of Burden - Trailer

Documentary films about poverty
Indian independent films
Indian documentary films
2006 films
2006 documentary films
2006 independent films